Apollo High School is a high school that is part of the Daviess County Public Schools district, located in Owensboro, Kentucky, United States. It was named after the Apollo Space Program, and opened in 1969 as a junior high school. It then converted into a high school in 1972 and held its first graduation in 1974. The school paper is named The Challenger, after the Space Shuttle Challenger. This school also has a marching band program called the Apollo Marching Eagles.

Apollo has been involved in a 1-1 laptop project since August 2005, providing a laptop to every incoming freshman for their use during the school year.

Notable alumni
 Rex Chapman, former NBA player
 Jeff Jones, college basketball coach
 Marc Salyers, professional basketball player, Europe
 Haley Strode, television and movie actress
 Brad Wilkerson, former Major League Baseball player
 Michael Waltrip, former NASCAR driver

References

External links

Daviess County Public Schools website

Buildings and structures in Owensboro, Kentucky
Schools in Daviess County, Kentucky
Public high schools in Kentucky
Educational institutions established in 1972
1972 establishments in Kentucky